The 2014 APRA Silver Scroll Awards was held on Thursday 30 October 2014 at TSB Bank Arena in Wellington, celebrating excellence in New Zealand songwriting. It was the first time since 2004 that the awards were hosted in Wellington, with Auckland being the usual location.

Silver Scroll award 

The Silver Scroll award celebrates outstanding achievement in songwriting of original New Zealand pop music. The short list of finalists was announced on 18 September. The evening's music performances were produced by musician and nominee Lukasz Buda. Each of the nominated songs were covered in a new style by another artist. The Silver Scroll award was presented by 2013 winner Lorde.

Long list 

In August 2014 a top 20 long list was announced. From this list APRA members voted to decide the five songs that make up the year's short list.

 Mahuia Bridgman-Cooper / Sean Sturm (School For Birds) "10,000 Things"
 Louis Baker "Back on my Feet"
 Samuel Scott / Luke Buda / Thomas Wedde / William Ricketts / Thomas Callwood / Christopher O'Conner (The Phoenix Foundation) "Bob Lennon John Dylan"
 Joel Little / Georgia Nott / Caleb Nott (Broods) "Bridges"
 Joseph Faris (Ezra Vine) "Celeste"
 Jolyon Mulholland (Mulholland) "Cry If You Want To"
 Jonathan Bree "Duckies Lament"
 Daniel McBride (Sheep, Dog & Wolf) "Glare"
 Brendan McKenna (Lake South) "Good Keen Man"
 Tom Scott / Lui Tuisau / Brandon Haru / Christopher James / Hayden Dick (@Peace) "Gravity"
 Edward Castelow (Dictaphone Blues) "Her Heart Breaks Like a Wave"
 Connan Hosford (Connan Mockasin) "I'm the Man That Will Find You"
 Jeremy Toy (She's So Rad) "Levels"
 Anna Coddington "Make You Mine"
 Hollie Fullbrook / Alexander Freer / Cass Mitchell (Tiny Ruins) "Me At the Museum, You In the Wintergardens"
 David Dallas / Aaron Iusitini / Jordan Iusitini / King Britt / Tim Motzer / Gertrude Morgan (David Dallas) "Runnin'"
 Mark Vanilau "Simplicity"
 Sidney Diamond / Isaiah Libeau (Sidney Diamond) "Speakers Blown"
 Tama Waipara / Mateheke Waititi (Tama Waipara) "Sunshine on the Water"
 Tami Neilson / Joshua Neilson (Tami Neilson) "Walk (Back To Your Arms)"

New Zealand Music Hall of Fame 

Composer Douglas Lilburn was posthumously inducted into the New Zealand Music Hall of Fame.

Other awards 

Six other awards were presented at the Silver Scroll Awards: APRA Maioha Award (for excellence in contemporary Maori music),  SOUNZ Contemporary Award (for creativity and inspiration in composition) and two awards acknowledging songs with the most radio and television play in New Zealand and overseas. In 2014, two new awards were introduced - APRA Best Original Music in a Feature Film Award and APRA Best Original Music in a Series Award.

APRA song awards 

Outside of the Silver Scroll Awards, APRA presented four genre awards in 2014. The APRA Best Pacific Song was presented at the Pacific Music Awards, the APRA Best Country Music Song was presented at the New Zealand Country Music Awards and the APRA Children’s Song of the Year and What Now Video of the Year were presented live on What Now.

References

External links 
 APRA AMCOS Silver Scroll Awards 

New Zealand music awards
2014 in New Zealand music